Von der Wall Point is a low ice-covered point on the south side of Thurston Island. It extends into Peacock Sound toward the northeast extremity of Sherman Island. Delineated from aerial photos taken by U.S. Navy Operation Highjump in December 1946. Named by Advisory Committee on Antarctic Names (US-ACAN) for J.H. Von der Wall, tractor driver and mechanic with the Byrd Antarctic Expedition in 1933–35.

Maps
 Thurston Island – Jones Mountains. 1:500000 Antarctica Sketch Map. US Geological Survey, 1967.
 Antarctic Digital Database (ADD). Scale 1:250000 topographic map of Antarctica. Scientific Committee on Antarctic Research (SCAR). Since 1993, regularly upgraded and updated.

Headlands of Ellsworth Land